Donnington Hospital is a series of almshouses at Donnington in the English county of Berkshire, run by the Donnington Hospital Trust. 

It was established in 1393 by Sir Richard Abberbury the Elder. The original site on the Oxford Road is now occupied by almshouses built in 1602. A further complex was added at Abberbury Close in 1938, followed by Groombridge Place in 1993. The Trust also has almshouses in Bucklebury and Bray in Berkshire and Iffley in Oxfordshire.

References

1393 establishments in England
Almshouses in Berkshire
Buildings and structures in Berkshire
Charities based in Berkshire
West Berkshire District
Grade II* listed buildings in Berkshire